Nineveh is an unincorporated community in Greene County, in the U.S. state of Pennsylvania.

History
A post office called Nineveh has been in operation since 1871. The community was named after the ancient city of Nineveh.

References

Unincorporated communities in Greene County, Pennsylvania
Unincorporated communities in Pennsylvania